Hamid Shirzadegan (8 March 1941 – 28 September 2007) was an Iranian football player. During his career, he was nicknamed Paa Talaaee (Golden Feet).

Club career
Shirzadegan started out at Shahin FC youth teams and in 1957 at the age of just 16 was selected for the senior team. He moved to Persepolis FC after Shahin disbanded due to political issues. He was known for his powerful shots, as if it could rip the goal net.

International career
Shirzadegan debuted for Iran on December 8, 1959 against India. He scored 9 goals in 14 games for Iran, thus giving him an excellent goal scoring rate.

After retirement
In his last years of life, Shirzadegan's health deteriorated. He was diagnosed with a progressive form of lung cancer which resulted in his death in Tehran, Iran on September 28, 2007 at the age of 66.

References

External links
Hamid Shirzadegan at TeamMelli.com

Iranian footballers
Iran international footballers
Shahin FC players
Persepolis F.C. players
Association football forwards
People from Tehran
1941 births
2007 deaths
Deaths from lung cancer
Deaths from cancer in Iran
Asian Games silver medalists for Iran
Asian Games medalists in football
Footballers at the 1966 Asian Games
Medalists at the 1966 Asian Games